Salman Mumtaz (az. Salman Məmmədəmin oğlu Əsgərov; May 20, 1884, Nuxa (old name of Shaki) – September 6, 1941, Oryol) — Azerbaijani poet, literature historian, historian and bibliographer, collector of medieval manuscripts. A member of the Union of Azerbaijani writers since 1934, a researcher in the 1st category of the literature sector of the Azerbaijani Branch of the Academy of Sciences of the Soviet Union, and director of the Azerbaijani Literature Department of the Azerbaijani National Institute of Scientific Research (1929-1932).  Salman Mumtaz (pseudonymous of Salman Mammedamin oghlu Asgarov; May 20, 1884 – September 6, 1941) was a renowned Azerbaijani literary scholar and poet. He was born in Shaki in 1884. In his efforts to collect, publish and promote the classical literary legacy, he discovered unknown manuscripts of a number of Azerbaijani poets and ashugs. Falling a victim to repressions, he was arrested in 1937 and killed by shooting in 1941 while imprisoned in Oryol.

Salman Mumtaz studied in Ashgabat. Since 1910, he spoke against religious fanaticism and superstition with his poems and feuilletons in "Molla Nasreddin" and other magazines. In addition to his native Azerbaijani, he mastered persian, arabic, russian, turkish and urdu languages. Salman Mumtaz prepared the works of Imadaddin Nasimi, Qovsi Tabrizi, Molla Panah Vagif, Gasim Bey Zakir, Mirza Shafi Vazeh and other Azerbaijani classics for publication. In 1927 - 1928, he published two volumes of Azerbaijani ashik poetry. He also compiled scientific texts of Khatai, Fuzuli, and others.
 
In October 1937, Mumtaz, a victim of Great Purge, was arrested and sentenced to ten years' imprisonment. He was shot in September 1941 in the city of Oryol while he was in prison. The 270 manuscripts collected by him were destroyed while he was arrested. On November 17, 1956, Salman Mumtaz was exonerated by the USSR Supreme Court after his death.

His life

Early years 

Salman Mammadamin oghlu Asgerov was born on May 20, 1884, in the Ganjali neighborhood of Nukha (now Shaki, the city of Azerbaijan). Salman’s dad, Mammadamin was a merchant and his family lived in Central Asia for a long time. 

Salman’s grandfather Aghaalasgar was very rich. Shortly after his death, his wife also died, and his house was burned down. His orphaned son Mammadamin takes refuge with his uncle, who has acquired their wealth, and works for jeweler. He visits Mashhad. On his way back, he made his way through Ashgabat, because he heard that lands were being sold here for a very cheap price. Mashhadi Mammadamin buys a lot of land from Ashgabat with the gold he brought from Shaki, he builds a home for himself. In a short time, he had a caravanserai and became store owner. Mammadamin, who was preparing to bring his family living in Sheki to the new property he built in Ashgabat, died of pneumonia in 1887 at the age of 32.

In 1900, Mammadamin's wife Mashhadi Zahra Khanum (1865-1938) took her younger brother Karbalai Askar from Baku and went to Ashgabat and acquire Mammadamin’s wealth. She also brings her sons Salman and Askhar to Ashgabat. Then she takes her older brother Karbalayı Movsum with her. Zahra Khanum who is related to Mirza Fatali Akhundzada, was a thoughtful and capable woman.  She buys a big box and fills it with gold until her sons grow up (Salman Mumtaz later spent those golds to buy Azerbaijani handwritten books and charity work). 

Since childhood, Salman Mumtaz was very interested in science; he knew Persian and Arabic languages perfectly. He studied in Ashgabat, where he also learned Persian and Arabic languages. Here, he learned Persian and Arabic as well as Urdu from a teacher named Mirza Asadulla. In 1893, 9-year-old Salman met with Mirza Alakbar Sabir in Ashgabat. Because of this meeting, Mumtaz develops a passion for literature. Having studied with mullah for 3 months, Salman worked hard day and night until the age of 22, mastered Persian, Arabic, Russian, and Urdu languages, and mastered the essentials of Eastern literature by heart.  Because of Salman's strong intellect, he had memorized many poems. Knowing the languages of the Islamic peoples made him interested in Eastern literature. 

Salman, who is engaged in trade at the loom of his uncle Karbalai Movsum, begins to collect Turkish (Azerbaijani) manuscripts.

Partnership with Molla Nasraddin journal  

According to the Turkish literary critic Yavuz Akpınar, in 1908-1909, after the publication of "Molla Nasreddin Magazine" in Tbilisi, Salman Mumtaz was also among the writers of this satirical magazine. At the same time, he also wrote poems in classical style. Together with his friends, he founded a literary meeting in Ashgabat. In 1908-1909, Mumtaz attracted the attention of readers with his satirical poems and articles, which were later published in "Molla Nasreddin Magazine", as well as in other organs of the Azerbaijani press. According to Yavuz Akpınar, "In his classic works, Mumtaz expressed his love for his country and nation to the reader, and showed and exposed the shortcomings of public life.  

According to the statements of Azerbaijani literary critic and historian Adalet Tahirzade, 1906 brought about a turning point in his thoughts: Mumtaz, who came to Ashgabat, corresponded with the collection of "Molla Nasreddin" and sent him a lot of news and sometimes poems. "Mozalan Bey's Travelogue", written together with Abdurrahim Bey Hagverdiyev and Gurbanali Sharifzadeh and published in "Molla Nasreddin" magazine in 1908, is considered one of his creative successes. In 1910, the second two-week meeting with Mirza Alakbar Sabir connected him even more to literature: after Sabir's encouragement, Mumtaz’s signature "Khortdan Bey" began to appear in "Molla Nasreddin" magazine.

In 1913, Mirza Jalil Mammadguluzade's "Geyrat" publishing house published his first book "Seyyid Ahmed Hatif Isfahani's Experience and Biography" in Tiflis. Salman Asgarzade, who stayed in Tbilisi for 3 months, met Abbas Sahhat, who has a deep knowledge in literature, history and art and helped publish the book "Hophopname" of Mirza Alakbar Sabir, who passed away 2 years ago. Mumtaz, who is friends with Mirza Jalil in Tbilisi, provides all the financing for the "Molla Nasreddin" magazine.  In 1913, the newspaper "Iqbal" wrote about Salman Mumtaz, one of the 11 modern poets of his time in the Caucasus: "With his 12 poems in the magazine "Molla Nasreddin", with the nickname of Salman Askerov or Mümtaz, he shows the shortcomings of the nation and serves with his pen to show the way to salvation.  In 1916, Salman Mumtaz tried hard to stage Jalil Mammadguluzade's "Ölülər" in Ashgabat, but the local authorities did not allow it.

Salman Mumtaz spoke against religious bigotry and superstitions with his poems and feuilletons that he wrote in the "Molla Nasreddin" magazine, which was published in Ashgabat until 1918. Mümtaz also assisted in the distribution of "Molla Nasreddin" magazine in Central Asia and other regions.

Return to Azerbaijan 

Salman Mumtaz returned to Baku with his family in 1918 and started working as a journalist in "Azerbaijan" newspaper. In this period, because of the national liberation struggle of the Azerbaijani people against Tsarist Russia, an independent state in Northern Azerbaijan and the first parliamentary republic of the Muslim East, the Azerbaijan Democratic Republic, was created during the First World War.

When Salman Mumtaz moved to Baku, he lived for a while in the 3rd building on Krasnokrestovsky (now Sheikh Shamil Street), on the property of his wife's brother Agarza. He opened his own shop in building 6/23 on Baryatinsky (formerly Fioletov, now - Abdulkarim Alizade Street). Salman Mumtaz, a member of the "Green Pen" society since 1919, spent a lot of money on the successful functioning of the society. 

Realizing that the independence of Azerbaijan is a national treasure, Salman Mumtaz highly appreciated Nuru Pasha, the general of the Ottoman army, the commander of the Caucasian Islamic Army, and Enver Pasha, the military minister of the Ottoman Empire and a political figure. In 1918, Salman Mumtaz met Nuru Pasha and recited the ghazal ‘Öyün millət!’ that dedicated to him. Mumtaz dedicated "Enveriyye" mukhammas to Enver Pasha. 

Azerbaijani actor and director Rza Tahmasib recalled Huseyn Javid's literary meetings in the Tabriz hotel and noted:

 

Salman Mumtaz preferred more research. Asgarov focused all his energies on collecting, researching, identifying, publishing and disseminating Azerbaijani literature. 

In 1924, Salman Asgarzade was the representative of the regional agency of "Azerneft supply" department with warehouses in Nukha, Gutgashen, Zaqatala, Gakh and Lagodekhi. He also worked in the Public Education Commissariat.

Academic activity 

After the establishment of Soviet power in Azerbaijan, he was active in the field of collecting, publishing and researching the classical literary heritage, and discovered several unknown manuscripts of works by Azerbaijani poets and ashiks. From 1920 to 1925, Mumtaz managed to collect about 200 books, articles and manuscripts of various writers from representatives of Azerbaijani literature and art. He published articles on Azerbaijani literature under the title "Forgotten leaves" in "Communist" newspaper. In 1920, Salman Mumtaz was the organizer and chairman of the commission for restoration of Azerbaijani literature. Mumtaz also published 15 works on the history of Azerbaijani literature and 2 works on folk literature, three volumes of Muhammad Fuzuli's works, "250 poets" collection, "Khatai" divan, "Sayed Ahmed Hatif", "Ali Bakuvi", "Sheki Savlari" etc. is the author of works. 

In 1925-1926 Salman Mumtaz published 24 poets from the Azerbaijani literature series - Imadaddin Nasimi, Qovsi Tabrizi, Nishat Shirvani, Aga Masih Shirvani, Molla Panah Vagif, Gasim Bey Zakir, Mirza Shafi Vazeh and other’s books in the publishing house of "Communist" newspaper. Many of these were the first collective editions of the poets' works.

He published the book "El şairləri" (1-2 volumes in 1927-1928; reprinted in 1935) and the stales of Sarı Ashik (1927, 1934) containing samples of Ashik poetry. 

Salman Mumtaz participated in the 1st Turkology Congress held in Baku in 1926. Here, Mumtaz introduced his new book "Nasimi" and presented it as a gift. Salman Askerzadeh met here with the academician, professor Mehmet Fuat Köprülüzadeh, whose work he is closely acquainted with, and the founder of "Füyüzat" magazine, Professor Ali bey Huseynzadeh. (In 1950, Mehmet Fuat Köprülüzade came from Turkey to the USSR as the Minister of Foreign Affairs of Turkey. He again applied to meet Salman Mumtaz and get information about him officially. However, his request remained unanswered. Because Salman Mumtaz was a victim of repression had been and was no longer alive). Tatar writer Aziz Gubaidullin was among those who participated in the congress. Speaking at the congress, Aziz Gubaydullin stated that Salman Mumtaz had published the works of Azerbaijani poets in the "Communist" newspaper, and before each publication, the biographical information written by Salman Mumtaz about the poets was "the most valuable biographical information", and he appreciated his efforts. Also, in 1926, academicians Vasily Bartold and Sergey Oldenburg, who looked at Mumtaz's personal library ("Library-Mumtaziya"), were impressed by the library's scientific structure, numerous layouts, and the wealth of manuscripts there. 

Salman Mumtaz's activity and creativity were inspired to some extent by the decrees of the leadership of the Azerbaijan SSR in the fields of literature and art in 1925-1932. 

During this period, Mumtaz wrote various works and published new books. Professor, scientific researcher and Doctor of Philosophy in Philology A. M. Nabiyev talked about Mumtaz's works "Sarı Ashik" and "El şairləri " written during this period of his creativity in his book "Idioms and Emotions of our People". 

From 1929 to 1932, Salman Mumtaz worked as the head of the pre-capitalist Azerbaijani literature section of the Azerbaijan State Scientific Research Institute. 

Since 1932, he was a researcher at the Azerbaijan State Museum. At the same time, Salman Mumtaz headed the classical heritage department of "Azernashr" publishing house from 1933 to 1936. From February 1933, Mumtaz worked as a researcher at the literary heritage department of the Azerbaijan Branch of the EA of the USSR. From April 1937, he headed the literature department of the Azerbaijan branch. Also, Mumtaz was a first-class employee of the literature department of the Institute of Language and Literature of the Azerbaijani branch of the Academy of Sciences of the USSR.

First Congress of USSR Writers in Moscow
In 1934, Salman Mumtaz participated in the First Congress of Soviet Writers held in the House of the Unions, Moscow. Mammad Kazim Alakbarli, who attended the conference, made a speech and noted in his report that Salman Mumtaz played a major role in examining the legacy of poet Mirza Shafi Vazeh and his incomparable services for Azerbaijani literature. Salman Mumtaz was also a close friend of Maxim Gorky. He met the great writer at the first congress of Writers of the USSR. Maxim Gorky took several photos with Azerbaijani writers. In the photos, Salman Mumtaz is sitting next to Maxim Gorky. According to the information received, Gorky bought a house in Moscow for Salman Mumtaz. In that year, Salman Mumtaz was invaluable in the delegation sent from Azerbaijan to Moscow to participate in the 1000th anniversary of Ferdowsi.

Other contributions

Salman Mumtaz's studies on literary and historical subjects were available. He was also interested in these studies and loved toponymics. Mumtaz traveled a lot and learned the geographical names of cities and villages during his travels. Mumtaz traveled simply with a backpack and his own shoes. 

Salman Mumtaz also worked on the compilation of scientific and critical works of classics of Azerbaijani literature. He mastered the biographies and works of Imadaddin Nasimi, Shah Ismail Khatai, Habibi, Muhammad Fuzuli, Molla Vali Vidadi, Molla Panah Vagif, Ismail Bey Gutgashinli and others, as well as the memories of Mirza Alakbar Sabir and Abbas Sahhat. Salman Mumtaz was a close friend of the famous poet and critic Mirza Alakbar Sabir. Another field of study and interest of Salman Mumtaz was to write about the life of Mirza Alakbar and read the works of Sabir. Salman Mumtaz, in addition to "Molla Nasreddin" magazine, "Azerbaijan" and "Communist" newspapers, "Zanbur", "Haji Leylak", "Tutu", "Sheypur", "Fuqara Fuyuzati", "Qurtuluş", "Brotherly Help", " Maarif and Culture", "Gizil Sharq", "Eastern Woman" magazines, as well as "Sada", "Gunesh", "Revolution", "Achyg soz", "Communist", "Taraqi", "Yeni Iqbal", "Iqbal" ", collaborated with "Adabiyyat Gazetesi" newspapers. In these newspapers and magazines, Salman Mumtaz "Ashgabatli", "Vasvası", "Eshshekarısı", "Momin Chinovnik", "Mumtaz" (translated from Arabic, this word means "chosen", "chosen from others"), "Sagsagan", "Sparrow" ", "Sarchagulu", "S.M.", "S. Asgarov", "Turkmendost", "Khortdangulu bey", "Khortdanbeyzade", "Chalagan" and other signatures, wrote satirical and lyrical poems, articles and feuilletons, prose works. These works of Mumtaz have not been collected until now. In addition to his native Azerbaijani, Salman Mumtaz has mastered Arabic, Persian, Turkish, Urdu and Russian.

Salman Mumtaz, who received spiritual strength from personalities like Mirza Alakbar Sabir and Mirza Jalil Mammadguluzade, created his artistic creativity in communication with friends such as Abdurrahim Bey Hagverdiyev, Huseyn Javid, Huseyn Sadiq (Seyid Huseyn), Abdulla Shaig, Jafar Jabbarli, Mikayil Mushfiq. His closeness with Leo Tolstoy, Maxim Gorky, Rabindranath Tagore, Sadreddin Aini and other masters of words also left certain traces in his outlook.

References

Sources 
 Prominent persons of Shaki
 Tahirzadə Ə. Salman Mümtaz (Tərcümeyi-hal oçerki). — Б.: Kür, 2002.
 Гулизаде М. Мумтаз // Краткая литературная энциклопедия / Главный редактор А. А. Сурков. — М.: Советская энциклопедия, 1967. — Т. 4. — С. 1016.

Further reading 
 

Azerbaijani literary theorists
Azerbaijani scholars
Azerbaijani poets
Azerbaijani publicists
1884 births
1941 deaths
20th-century poets
Soviet literary historians
Soviet male writers
20th-century male writers